The following is a list of Coptic monasteries in Egypt and around the world.

Coptic Orthodox Monasteries in Egypt

See of Saint Mark Alexandria

 St. Damiana Coptic Orthodox Convent - (Damietta)
 St. George Coptic Orthodox Monastery - (Mit Damsis, Damietta)
 St. Menas Coptic Orthodox Monastery - (Mariout, Alexandria)
  St. Mercurius Coptic Orthodox Nunnery - (Alexandria)
 Ennaton Coptic Orthodox Monastery - (Dakahlia) - (uninhabited)
 Metanoia Coptic Orthodox Monastery - (East Alexandria) - (uninhabited)
 Oktikaidekaton Coptic Orthodox Monastery - (Alexandria) - (uninhabited)
 Pempton Coptic Orthodox Monastery - (Mariout, Alexandria) - (uninhabited)
 St. Cyprius (Dair Qabriyus) Coptic Orthodox Monastery - (Northeast Alexandria) - (uninhabited)
 (# 600) Coptic Orthodox Monasteries - (In and outside the city of Alexandria) - (Destroyed in the 7th century)
 St. Menas Coptic Orthodox Monastery - (Abu Mena) - (Destroyed)

Diocese of Wadi El Natrun

 Paromeos Coptic Orthodox Monastery - (Wadi El Natrun)
 St. Macarius Coptic Orthodox Monastery - (Wadi El Natrun)
 St. Pishoy Coptic Orthodox Monastery - (Wadi El Natrun)
 Virgin Mary (El-Sourian) Coptic Orthodox Monastery - (Wadi El Natrun)
 St. George Coptic Orthodox Monastery - (Khatatba, Monufia)
 St. Thomas Coptic Orthodox Monastery - (Khatatba, Monufia)
 Armenian Coptic Orthodox Monastery - (uninhabited)
 St. John the Dwarf Coptic Orthodox Monastery - (uninhabited)
 St. Moses the Black Coptic Orthodox Monastery - (uninhabited)

Diocese of Cairo

 St. Anthony Coptic Orthodox Monastery - (Qimn al-Arus) 
 St. Paul the Theban Coptic Orthodox Monastery - (Qimn al-Arus) 
 St. George Coptic Orthodox Nunnery - (Coptic Cairo)
 St. Mercurius (Abu-Sefein) Coptic Orthodox Convent - (Coptic Cairo)
 St. Mercurius Coptic Orthodox Monastery - (Tammua)
 St. Menas Coptic Orthodox Monastery - (Fumm al-Khalig)
 St. Mary Coptic Orthodox Convent - (Old Cairo)
 St. Samaan the Tanner Coptic Orthodox Monastery - (Zabbaleen, Mokattam)
 St. Theodore the Oriental Coptic Orthodox Monastery - (Haret Elroum)
 Virgin Mary Coptic Orthodox Convent - (Haret Zuweila)
 St. George Coptic Orthodox Convent - (Haret Zuweila)
 St. Barsoum El-Erian Coptic Orthodox Monastery - (Monshat Naser, Helwan)
 Prophet Jeremiah Coptic Orthodox Monastery - (Saqqara) - (uninhabited)
 St. Arsenius Coptic Orthodox Monastery - (Wadi al-Tih) - (uninhabited)

Diocese of Fayyum
 Archangel Gabriel Coptic Orthodox Monastery - (Naqlun, Fayyum)
 Holy Virgin Mary (Deir al-Hammam) Coptic Orthodox Monastery - (Luhan, Fayyum)
St. Macarius of Alexandria Coptic Orthodox Monastery - (Wadi Elrayan, Fayyum)
 St. George Coptic Orthodox Monastery - (Fayyum)

Diocese of Beni Suef
Monastery of Saint Samuel the Confessor

Diocese of Eastern Desert

 St. Anthony Coptic Orthodox Monastery - (Eastern Desert)
 St. Paul the Anchorite Coptic Orthodox Monastery - (Eastern Desert)
 St. Catherine Greek Orthodox Monastery - (Saint Catherine)

Diocese of Minya & al-Ashmunein
 al-Sanquriya Coptic Orthodox Monastery - (Oxyrhynchus)
 Holy Virgin Mary Coptic Orthodox Monastery - (Minya)
 St. Fana Coptic Orthodox Monastery - (Qasr Hur)
 St. Pishoy Coptic Orthodox Monastery - (Deir el-Bersha, Mallawi)
 St. John (Abu Hinnis) Coptic Orthodox Monastery - (Ansena) - (uninhabited)
 Holy Virgin Mary Coptic Orthodox Monastery - (Minya) - (uninhabited)

Diocese of Asyut

 Holy Virgin Mary Coptic Orthodox Monastery - (Deir el Ganadla, Asyut)
 Holy Virgin Mary Coptic Orthodox Monastery - (Durunka)
 Holy Virgin Mary Coptic Orthodox Monastery - (El-Qusiya)
 The Hanging Coptic Orthodox Monastery - (Deir El-Mualaq)
 St. Apollo at Bawit Coptic Orthodox Monastery - (Asyut) - (uninhabited)
  St. Mina Coptic Orthodox Monastery - (Abnub, Asyut)

Diocese of Sohag

 Archangel Michael Coptic Orthodox Monastery - (Akhmim)
 Holy Virgin Mary Coptic Orthodox Monastery - (Hawawish, Akhmim)
 St. George (Dair al-Hadid) Coptic Orthodox Monastery - (Akhmim)
 Coptic Orthodox Monastery of the Martyrs - (Akhmim)
 St. Pachomius the Martyr Coptic Orthodox Monastery - (Akhmim)
 St. Pisada Coptic Orthodox Monastery - (Akhmim)
 St. Thomas the Hermit Coptic Orthodox Monastery - (Akhmim)
 St. Karas Coptic Orthodox Monastery - (Sohag)
 St. Michael Coptic Orthodox Monastery - (as-Salamuni) 
 St. Pishay Coptic Orthodox Monastery - (Sohag)

St. Shenouda The Archimandrite Coptic Orthodox Monastery - (Sohag) 
 Abouna Yassa Coptic Orthodox Monastery - (Tima)
 The Seven Mountains Coptic Orthodox Monastery - (Bir al-'Ain)
 Naga ed-Deir (ancient monastery excavation site near just north of Girga)

Diocese of Qena

 Holy Cross Coptic Orthodox Monastery - (Hagir Danfīq, Qena)
 St. Badaba Coptic Orthodox Monastery - (Nag Hammadi, Qena)
 Archangel Michael Coptic Orthodox Monastery - (Naqada, Qena)
 St. George Coptic Orthodox Monastery - (Naqada, Qena)
 Archangel Michael Coptic Orthodox Monastery - (Qamula, Qena)
 St. Andrews Coptic Orthodox Monastery - (Qamula, Qena)
 St. Pisentius Coptic Orthodox Monastery - (Qamula, Qena)
 St. Victor Coptic Orthodox Monastery - (Qamula, Qena) - (uninhabited)

Diocese of Luxor

 St. George Coptic Orthodox Monastery - (Mahrosa, Luxor)
 St. George Coptic Orthodox Monastery - (Riziqat, Luxor)
 Coptic Orthodox Monastery of the Martyrs - (Esna, Luxor)
 St. Matthew the Potter Coptic Orthodox Monastery - (Esna, Luxor)
 St. Pachomius Coptic Orthodox Monastery - (El-Shayeb, Luxor)
 St. Pishoy Coptic Orthodox Monastery - (Armant, Luxor)
 St. Theodore the Warrior Coptic Orthodox Monastery - (Luxor)
 St. Wannas Coptic Orthodox Monastery - (Luxor)

Diocese of Aswan
 St. Pachomius Coptic Orthodox Monastery - (Edfu)
 St. Simeon (St. Hadra) Coptic Orthodox Monastery - (Qubbet el-Hawa)

New Valley Governorate
 Archangel Michael Coptic Orthodox Monastery - (Dakhla Oasis) - (Destroyed)
 St. Matthew Coptic Orthodox Monastery - (Dakhla Oasis) - (Destroyed)

Coptic Orthodox Patriarchate of Jerusalem

Palestine
 St. Anthony Coptic Orthodox Monastery - (Jerusalem)
 St. Mary Coptic Orthodox Convent - (Bethlehem)
 Al-Sultan Coptic Orthodox Monastery - (Jerusalem)
 St George Coptic Orthodox Convent - (Jerusalem)
 St. Anthony Coptic Orthodox Monastery - (Jericho)
 St. Bishoy Coptic Orthodox Monastery - (Jericho)
 St. Zacchaeus Coptic Orthodox Monastery - (Jericho)

Syria
 St. George Coptic Orthodox Monastery - (Homs)

Jordan
 St. Anthony Coptic Orthodox Monastery - (Madaba)

Coptic Orthodox monasteries overseas 
Coptic Orthodox monasteries Outside Egypt.

Australia
 St. Anthony Coptic Orthodox Monastery - (Heathcote, Victoria)
 St. Shenouda The Archimandrite Coptic Orthodox Monastery - (Putty, New South Wales)
 St. Mary and St Anthony Coptic Orthodox Monastery - (Kooralbyn, Queensland)
 Archangel Michael Coptic Orthodox Monastery for Nuns - (Woodend, Victoria)
St Mary and St Demiana's Monastery, Queensland Australia for Nuns

Canada
 St. Anthony Coptic Orthodox Monastery - (Perth, Ontario)
 St. Mary, St. George & St. Philopateer Coptic Orthodox Convent - (Paisley, Ontario)
St. George & St. Paul The Anchorite Monastery

Germany
 St. Anthony Coptic Orthodox Monastery -  (Kröffelbach, Germany)
 St. Mary & St. Mauritius Coptic Orthodox Monastery - (Höxter, Germany)

Italy
 St. Shenouda The Archimandrite Coptic Orthodox Monastery - (Milan)

France 
 St. Mary and Archangel Michael Monastery

Netherlands 
 El Amir Tadros El Meshreky Monastery

Austria 
 St. Anthony’s Monastery

United States of America 
 St. Anthony Coptic Orthodox Monastery - (Newberry Springs, California)
 St. Mary & St. Moses Abbey - (Sandia, Texas)
 St. Mary & St. Demiana Coptic Orthodox Convent - (Dawsonville, Georgia)
 St. Mary & St. John The Beloved Coptic Orthodox Convent - (Warren, Ohio)
 St. John The Beloved Coptic Orthodox Monastery - (Canadensis, Pennsylvania)
 St. Paul Brotherhood - (Murrieta, California)
Coptic Monastery of St. Shenouda in Rochester - (New York)
Holy Virgin Mary Spiritual Vineyard - (Charlton, Massachusetts)
St. Mary & St. Phoebe Consecrated Sisters
St. Katherine and St. Verena Coptic Orthodox Convent https://www.sksvcopticconvent.org/

United Kingdom
 St. Athanasius Coptic Orthodox Monastery - (England)
 St. George Coptic Orthodox Convent - (Dublin, Ireland)

Gallery

See also
 List of Coptic Orthodox Churches in the United States
 Coptic monasticism
 Coptic Orthodox Church of Alexandria

References

External links
 Partial List of Egyptian Coptic Monasteries in Egypt and USA
 The official list of Monasteries and Churches of the Patriarchate of Jerusalem

 
Coptic monasteries